Edward Everett Willkie (December 25, 1896 – October 15, 1956) was an American wrestler. He competed in the Greco-Roman heavyweight event at the 1920 Summer Olympics. He was the brother of Wendell Willkie.

References

External links
 

1896 births
1956 deaths
Olympic wrestlers of the United States
Wrestlers at the 1920 Summer Olympics
American male sport wrestlers
People from Elwood, Indiana
Sportspeople from Indiana